Michael Tommy (born June 30, 1979 in Freetown) is a Sierra Leonean international football goalkeeper. He played recently for Grecia in the Costa Rican Second Division. Tommy was the first-choice goalkeeper for the Leone Stars in recent games but he has since lost that position to Christian Caulker.

Career
Tommy was born and raised in Freetown, Sierra Leone's capital city. He started his football career with local club Mighty Blackpool in the Sierra Leone National Premier League before moving to Liberian Premier League giant Mighty Barolle in 2001. In the 2003/2004 season, C.S. Cartaginés signed him from Mighty Barolle but released him to Municipal Liberia on 2004/05 season. He is no longer a goalkeeper.

He is currently working in a call center called Valor Global as Sprint Supervisor, the facilities are located in Costa Rica at the American Free Zone.

His life has taken a complete turn, he is a missionary, he changed the soccer fields for the churches, and the technical talks for the word of God, which he gives to the youth of the churches where he lives. Besides he has a radio show on Radio Bahía 107.9, called "The Lord will Provide", where he gives advice to his radio listeners.

External links

https://web.archive.org/web/20070216235627/http://www.cartagines.net/mainsite/index.php?option=com_content&task=view&id=43&Itemid=80

1979 births
Living people
Sportspeople from Freetown
Sierra Leonean footballers
Sierra Leone international footballers
Sierra Leonean expatriate footballers
Expatriate footballers in Liberia
Expatriate footballers in Costa Rica
Association football goalkeepers
Mighty Blackpool players
Mighty Barrolle players
C.S. Herediano footballers
Belén F.C. players
Puntarenas F.C. players
C.S. Cartaginés players
Municipal Liberia footballers